The 1979–80 Los Angeles Kings season was the Kings' 13th season in the National Hockey League. It saw the Kings qualify for the playoffs, placing second in the Norris Division, but they lost in the first round to the New York Islanders. Just prior to the end of the season, the Kings sent Butch Goring to the Islanders for Billy Harris and Dave Lewis.  Goring would help the Islanders defeat the Kings on their way to their first of 4 Stanley Cup wins.  They also had the worst penalty kill percentage in a season in the history of the NHL at 67.70%.

Offseason

Regular season

Final standings

Schedule and results

Playoffs

Player statistics

Awards and records

Transactions
The Kings were involved in the following transactions during the 1979–80 season.

Trades

Free agent signings

Free agents lost

Free agent compensation

Waivers

Expansion draft

Draft picks
Los Angeles's draft picks at the 1979 NHL Entry Draft held at the Queen Elizabeth Hotel in Montreal, Quebec.

Farm teams

See also
1979–80 NHL season

References

External links

Los Angeles Kings seasons
Los Angeles Kings
Los Angeles Kings
1979 in sports in California
1980 in sports in California